Penikeru is a village of in East Godavari district of the Indian state of Andhra Pradesh. It is located in Alamuru mandal of Rajahmundry revenue division.

Geography 
Penikeru is spread over an area of 4.10 km2 (1.58 sq mi).

Demographics 
As of  2011 Census of India  there are total 1,097 families residing in the village Penikeru. The total population of Penikeru is 3,635 out of which 1,795 are males and 1,840 are females thus the Average Sex Ratio of Penikeru is 1,025.

Governance 
As per constitution of India and Panchyati Raaj Act (Amendment 1998), Penikeru village is administrated by Sarpanch (Head of Village) who is elected representative of the village.

History 
Penikeru is a village in Alamuru Mandal in East Godavari District of Andhra Pradesh State, India. It is 57 km from District headquarters Kakinada.

The village got its name from the plant called Peniki, Peniki root (Peniki-Veru) is used for psychological treatment. Peikeru village is famous for chronic psychological treatment. Unmadha Vidyalayam is located in this village.

Transport 
Mandapeta is the nearest town to Penikeru. Mandapeta is 8 km from Penikeru. Road connectivity is there from Mandapeta to Penikeru.

Ravulapalem APSRTC Bus Station, Mandapeta APSRTC Bus Station are the nearby bus stations to Penikeru .APSRTC runs a number of buses from major cities to here.

Education 
The primary and secondary school education is imparted by government, aided and private schools, under the School Education Department of the state. The medium of instruction followed by different schools are English, and Telugu.

As per the Census 2011, the literacy rate of Penikeru is 67.1%. Thus Penikeru village has higher literacy rate compared to 63.8% of East Godavari district. The male literacy rate is 70.01% and the female literacy rate is 64.15% in Penikeru village.

Nearby Villages to Penikeru 
Pedapalle ( 2 km ), Chintaluru ( 2 km ), Jonnada ( 2 km ), Navabupeta ( 2 km ), Pinapalle ( 3 km ) are the nearby Villages to Penikeru. Penikeru is surrounded by Kapileswarapuram Mandal towards East, Ravulapalem Mandal towards South, Mandapeta Mandal towards North, Kadiam Mandal towards North .

References 

Villages in East Godavari district